Lycorine is a toxic crystalline alkaloid found in various Amaryllidaceae species, such as the cultivated bush lily (Clivia miniata), surprise lilies (Lycoris), and daffodils (Narcissus). It may be highly poisonous, or even lethal, when ingested in certain quantities.  Regardless, it is sometimes used medicinally, a reason why some groups may harvest the very popular Clivia miniata.

Source
Lycorine is found in different species of Amaryllidaceae which include flowers and bulbs of daffodil, snowdrop (Galanthus) or spider lily (Lycoris). Lycorine is the most frequent alkaloid of Amaryllidaceae.

The earliest diversification of Amaryllidaceae was most likely in North Africa and the Iberian peninsula and that lycorine is one of the oldest in the Amaryllidaceae alkaloid biosynthetic pathway.

Mechanism of action
There is currently very little known about the mechanism of action of lycorine, although there have been some tentative hypotheses advanced concerning the  metabolism of the alkaloid, based on experiments carried out upon beagle dogs.

Lycorine inhibits protein synthesis, and may inhibit ascorbic acid biosynthesis, although studies on the latter are controversial and inconclusive.  Presently, it serves some interest in the study of certain yeasts, the principal organism on which lycorine is tested.

It is known that lycorine weakly inhibits acetylcholinesterase (AChE) and ascorbic acid biosynthesis. The IC50 of lycorine was found to vary between the different species it can be found in, but a common deduction from the experiments on lycorine was that it had some effect on inhibiting AChE.

Lycorine exhibits cytostatic effects by targeting the actin cytoskeleton rather than by inducing apoptosis in cancer cells, though lycorine was found to apoptosis at different stages in a cells cycle.

Biosynthesis
One possible synthesis of lycorine could come from O-Methylnorbelladine, which can be seen in the image to the right.

Toxicity
Poisoning by lycorine most often occurs through the ingestion of daffodil bulbs.
Daffodil bulbs are sometimes confused with onions, leading to accidental poisoning.

In a study of dosage used on beagle dogs, the first sign of nausea was observed at as little of a dose of 0.5 mg/kg and occurred within a 2.5 hour span. The effective dose to induce emesis in the dogs was seen to be 2.0 mg/kg and lasted no longer than 2.5 hours after administration.

Symptoms
Symptoms of lycorine toxicity are nausea, vomiting, diarrhea, and convulsions.

Current research
Lycorine has been seen to have promising biological and pharmacological activities such as antibacterial, antiviral, or anti-inflammatory effects and may have anticancer properties. It has displayed various inhibitory properties towards multiple cancer cell lines that include, lymphoma, carcinoma, multiple myeloma, melanoma, leukemia, human A549 non-small-cell lung cancer, human OE21 esophageal cancer and more.

Lycorine has many derivatives used for anti-cancer research such as lycorine hydrochloride (LH) which is a novel anti-ovarian cancer agent, and data has shown that LH effectively inhibited mitotic proliferation of Hey1B cells with very low toxicity. This drug could be used for effective anti-ovarian cancer therapy in the future.

References

External links 
 
 

Isoquinoline alkaloids
Quinoline alkaloids
Diols
Phenanthridines
Plant toxins
Acetylcholinesterase inhibitors
Protein synthesis inhibitors